{{DISPLAYTITLE:C6H6O2}}
The molecular formula C6H6O2 (molar mass: 110.1 g/mol) may refer to:

 2-Acetylfuran
 Benzenediols
 Catechol (benzene-1,2-diol)
 Resorcinol (benzene-1,3-diol)
 Hydroquinone (benzene-1,4-diol)